Janhalacaste is a genus of braconid wasps in the family Braconidae. There are at least three described species in Janhalacaste, found in Costa Rica.

Species
These three species belong to the genus Janhalacaste:
 Janhalacaste danieli Fernandez-Triana & Boudreault, 2018
 Janhalacaste guanacastensis Fernandez-Triana & Boudreault, 2018
 Janhalacaste winnieae Fernandez-Triana & Boudreault, 2018

References

Microgastrinae